Vincenzo Aquilanti (born December 12, 1939) is an Italian chemist, emeritus professor at the University of Perugia.

Career
He graduated in Chemistry with Vincenzo Caglioti and Giangualberto Volpi at Sapienza University of Rome in 1963, where he started his career of scientist. In 1967–1968 he had been working in Dudley Herschbach's group at Harvard University. At the University of Perugia from 1968, he became full professor of general and inorganic chemistry in 1980. He is emeritus professor at the Università degli Studi di Perugia since 2010. He had been invited professor at the Federal University of Bahia from 2012 to 2016. Currently, he is associated to the Matter Structure Institute of the National Research Council

Research
The scientific activity, documented by more than 430 papers (h-index 50), concerns experimental and theoretical aspects in the fields of radiation chemistry, of the ionic reactions in the gas phase, of elastic, inelastic and reactive collisions, between atoms and simple molecules of atmospheric and astrophysical interest, of quantum and semi-classical physical chemistry.

His experimental activity was initiated in Rome in the Sixties, with the study of the role of the reactions involving ions in radiation chemistry and of the mechanisms of ion-molecule reactions.   The construction in Perugia in the Seventies of an original experimental apparatus, where coupling the technique of crossed atomic and molecular beams with the spectroscopic emission detection has led to the discovery of phenomena of polarization and interference in atomic and molecular collisions. A variant of such an apparatus is still operative in Barcelona. In the 80s, through an original technique of magnetic analysis of type Stern-Gerlach for the orbital states of polarization of spin and electronic angular momentum of atoms, such as halogens (F and Cl), oxygen, sulphur, he has obtained an ample phenomenology on the interactions of these species by molecular-beams scattering. These interactions provide remarkable information on the initial phases of chemical reactions, that involve long range forces determined by their open shell structure. From the Nineties, following the discovery of effects of rotational alignment in molecules in supersonic expansions, he has established a technology for the study of collisions of aligned molecules, obtaining the characterization of intermolecular forces and of their anisotropy. In the last years, he is developing, in the Perugia, Trieste, Taipei and Osaka laboratories, experimental instrumentations for the study of the collisional origin of molecular chirality.

On   this   theme   (quantum mechanics in the short-wave limit) he has studied non-adiabatic processes, the role   of   singularities   (catastrophes),   the   chaotic   regime,   and   has   also contributed to the  historical –  epistemological  debate. His  major  theoretical effort has concerned the formulation and implementation of the treatment of the dynamics of processes involving few bodies, that encounter as a quantum mechanical principal obstacle the necessity to explicitly treat the coupling of angular momenta and   spin, with electronic, rotational and orbital momenta. He   has   contributed   in   this   area   to   the   introduction   of   hyperspherical coordinates and harmonics, developing analytical tools and original algorithms. In the last years, he has also focused on the study of the deviations from the Arrhenius law.

Academies and memberships
1985–91 – Italian Chemical Society (President, Section Umbria, 1985–1991). 

1995–98 – European Physical Society (deputy-chair, Atomic and Molecular Physics Division.

2005–10 – INTAS Council of Scientists, Bruxelles.

Italian Physical Society.

Italian Society of Logic and Philosophy of Science.

Awards and honors
In 2005 he was elected to the Accademia Nazionale delle Scienze detta dei XL and in 2009 to the Accademia Nazionale dei Lincei.

In 2009 a special issue of the Journal of Physical Chemistry is dedicated to him by the American Chemical Society. He was awarded the 2014 R.B. Bernstein Medal in Stereodynamics.

Publications
 
 
 
 
 ; Angew. Chem. 117, 2408–12 (2005).

References

External links
Group of Theory and Experiments on Elementary Processes

1939 births
Italian chemists
Academic staff of the University of Perugia
Sapienza University of Rome alumni
Living people